Un amore in prima classe (internationally released as Love in First Class) is a 1980 Italian comedy film directed by Salvatore Samperi.

Cast 

 Enrico Montesano: Carmelo 
 Sylvia Kristel: Beatrice 
 Lorenzo Aiello: Malcolm 
 Franca Valeri: Signora Della Rosa 
 Felice Andreasi: Oscar Della Rosa 
 Memmo Carotenuto: Vecchio ferroviere cieco 
 Sergio Di Pinto: Bipo 
 Gianfranco Manfredi: Controllore 
 Enzo Cannavale: Prete 
 Luc Merenda: Poliziotto 
 Christian De Sica: Venditore in stazione 
 Adriana Russo

References

External links

1980 films
1980 comedy films
Films directed by Salvatore Samperi
Italian comedy films
Rail transport films
1980s Italian-language films
1980s Italian films